Phallogaster is a fungal genus in the family Phallogastraceae. The genus is monotypic, containing the single secotioid species Phallogaster saccatus, commonly known as the club-shaped stinkhorn or the stink poke.

References

External links
 

Fungi of North America
Hysterangiales
Monotypic Basidiomycota genera
Secotioid fungi